Robert Mallet-Stevens (March 24, 1886 – February 8, 1945) was a French architect and designer.

Early life
Mallet-Stevens was born in Paris in a house called Maison-Laffitte (designed by François Mansart in the 17th century). His father and his grandfather were art collectors in Paris and Brussels. He received his formal training at the École Spéciale d'Architecture in Paris, during which he wrote Guerande about relationships between the different forms of art.

Career
In 1924 Mallet-Stevens published a magazine called La Gazette Des 7 Arts and at the same time with the help of Ricciotto Canudo founded the Club des amis du 7ème art. A Paris street in the 16th arrondissement, Rue Mallet-Stevens, was built by him in the 1920s and has on it six houses designed by him.

A portfolio of 32 of Mallet-Stevens' designs was published under the title Une Cité Moderne in 1922. In addition to designing shops, factories, a fire station in Paris, apartment buildings, private homes, and interiors, he was one of the first architects to show an interest in cinema. He designed film sets and his design for Marcel L'Herbier's silent film L'Inhumaine (1924) is considered a masterpiece.

In 1929, surrealist photographer and filmmaker Man Ray made a film inspired by his design for the buildings named "Villa Noailles" entitled The Mysteries of the Château de Dé.

During his career he assembled a team of artisans and craftspeople who worked with him: interior designers, sculptors, master glaziers, lighting specialists, and ironsmiths.  An example of his collaborative nature is provided by the Union des Artistes Moderne (UAM), formed in 1929 by a group of 25 dissidents of the Société des Artistes-Décorateurs (SAD), and presided over by Robert.

Legacy
Mallet-Stevens ordered that his archives be destroyed upon his death. His wishes were honored and his memory fell into obscurity. A French exhibit of his drawings, models, and actual works at the Centre Pompidou in 2005 sparked public interest in his contributions.

Buildings and projects
Villa Paul Poiret (1921–1923), in Mézy-sur-Seine completed in 1932
Villa Noailles (1923–1928), in Hyères
Villa Cavrois (1929–1932), in Croix
Rue Mallet-Stevens (1927), Paris:
Villa Allatini, Rue Mallet-Stevens 5
Villa de Daniel Dreyfuss, Rue Mallet-Stevens 7
Villa Reifenberg, Rue Mallet-Stevens 8
Villa des Frères Martel, Rue Mallet-Stevens 10
Villa Mallet-Stevens, Rue Mallet-Stevens 12
Garage Alfa Romeo, Rue Marbeuf, Paris
House of Louis Barillet, Square Vergennes 15, Paris
Caserne des Pompiers (firestation, 1935), rue Mesnil 8, Paris
Immeuble de rapport de la rue Méchain (1928-1929), in Paris where Tamara de Lempicka used to live until the World War II.

References

External links

Fondation des amis de Mallet Stevens 

 Studio International – Robert Mallet-Stevens

20th-century French architects
Artists from Paris
1886 births
1945 deaths
Burials at Passy Cemetery
École Spéciale d'Architecture alumni
Modernist architects from France
Art Deco architects
Robert Mallet-Stevens